HR 7578 (also known as V4200 Sagittarii) is a binary star in the constellation of Sagittarius. Their combined apparent magnitude is 6.18. Parallax measurements by the Gaia spacecraft put the system at 46.01 light-years (14.107 parsecs) away, making this a nearby system.

The two stars of HR 7578 are fairly old, older than the Pleiades but possibly younger than the Hyades. Both are K-type main-sequence stars.

HR 7578 is a BY Draconis variable. This is a class of variable star whose variability comes from starspots on the stars' surfaces. HR 7578 also has a common proper motion companion, 2MASS J19542064−2356398. It is a red dwarf that is at least 580 astronomical units from the central star system.

References

BY Draconis variables
K-type main-sequence stars
Spectroscopic binaries
Sagittarius (constellation)
Durchmusterung objects
0770
188088
097944
7578
Sagittarii, V4200